Krasnoselsky District is the name of several administrative and municipal districts in Russia.
Krasnoselsky District, Moscow, a district in Central Administrative Okrug of the federal city of Moscow
Krasnoselsky District, Saint Petersburg, an administrative district of the federal city of St. Petersburg
Krasnoselsky District, Kostroma Oblast, an administrative and municipal district of Kostroma Oblast

See also
Krasnoselsky (disambiguation)
Krasnoye Selo (inhabited locality)

References